The Methodist Episcopal Church, South (MEC, S; also Methodist Episcopal Church South) was the American Methodist denomination resulting from the 19th-century split over the issue of slavery in the Methodist Episcopal Church (MEC). Disagreement on this issue had been increasing in strength for decades between churches of the Northern and Southern United States; in 1845 it resulted in a schism at the General Conference of the MEC held in Louisville, Kentucky.

This body maintained its own polity for nearly 100 years until the formation in 1939 of the Methodist Church, uniting the Methodist Episcopal Church, South, with the older Methodist Episcopal Church and much of the Methodist Protestant Church, which had separated from Methodist Episcopal Church in 1828. The Methodist Church in turn merged in 1968 with the Evangelical United Brethren Church to form the United Methodist Church, now one of the largest and most widely spread Christian denominations in America.

In 1940, some more theologically conservative MEC,S congregations, which dissented from the 1939 merger, formed the Southern Methodist Church, which still exists as a small, conservative denomination headquartered in South Carolina. Some dissenting congregations from the Methodist Protestant Church also objected to the 1940 merger and continue as a separate denomination, headquartered in Mississippi.

History

John Wesley, the founder of Methodism, was appalled by slavery in the British colonies. When the Methodist Episcopal Church (MEC) was founded in the United States at the "Christmas Conference" synod meeting of ministers at the Lovely Lane Chapel in Baltimore in December 1784, the denomination officially opposed slavery very early. Numerous Methodist missionaries toured the South in the "Great Awakening" and tried to convince slaveholders to manumit their slaves. In the first two decades after the American Revolutionary War, a number did free their slaves. The number of free blacks increased markedly at this time, especially in the Upper South.

During the early nineteenth century, Methodists and Baptists in the South began to modify their approach in order to gain support from common planters, yeomen, and slaves. They began to argue for better treatment of slaves, saying that the Bible acknowledged slavery but that Christianity had a paternalistic role to improve conditions.

The invention of the cotton gin had enabled profitable cultivation of cotton in new areas of the South, increasing the demand for slaves. Manumissions nearly ceased and, after slave rebellions, the states made them extremely difficult to accomplish. Northern Methodist congregations increasingly opposed slavery, and some members began to be active in the abolitionist movement. The southern church accommodated it as part of a legal system.

But, even in the South, Methodist clergy were not supposed to own slaves. In 1840, the Rev. James Osgood Andrew, a bishop living in Oxford, Georgia, bought a slave. Fearing that she would end up with an inhumane owner if sold, Andrew kept her but let her work independently. The 1840 MEC General Conference considered the matter, but did not expel Andrew.  Four years later, Andrew married a woman who owned a slave inherited from her mother, making the bishop the owner of two slaves. As bishop, he was considered to have obligations both in the North and South and was criticized for holding slaves.

The 1844 General Conference voted to suspend Bishop Andrew from exercising his episcopal office until he gave up the slaves. Southern delegates to the conference disputed the authority of a General Conference to discipline bishops. The cultural differences that had divided the nation during the mid-19th century were also dividing the Methodist Episcopal Church. The 1844 dispute led Methodists in the South to break off and form a separate denomination, the Methodist Episcopal Church, South (MEC,S). Delegates from the southern conferences met at a Convention at the Fourth Street Church in Louisville, Kentucky, May 1–19, 1845 and organized the Methodist Episcopal Church, South.

Civil War
The statistics for 1859 showed the MEC,S had as enrolled members some 511,601 whites and 197,000 blacks (nearly all of whom were slaves), and 4,200 Indians. In 1858 MEC,S operated 106 schools and colleges.

The American Civil War resulted in widespread destruction of property, including church buildings and institutions, but it was marked by a series of strong revivals that began in General Robert E. Lee's army and spread throughout the region. Chaplains tended the wounded after the battles. John Berry McFerrin (1807-1887) recalled:

African Americans
After the Civil War, when African American slaves gained freedom, many left the Methodist Episcopal Church, South. They joined either the independent black denominations of the African Methodist Episcopal Church founded in Philadelphia or the African Methodist Episcopal Zion Church founded in New York, but some also joined the (Northern) Methodist Episcopal Church, which planted new congregations in the South. The two independent black denominations both sent missionaries to the South after the war to aid freedmen, and attracted hundreds of thousands of new members, from both Baptists and Methodists, and new converts to Christianity. Out of 200,000 African-American members in the MEC,S in 1860, by 1866 only 49,000 remained.

in 1870, most of the remaining African-American members of the MEC,S split off on friendly terms with white colleagues to form the Colored Methodist Episcopal Church, now the Christian Methodist Episcopal Church, taking with them $1.5 million in buildings and properties. The new denomination avoided the Republican politics of the AME and AME Zion congregations. It had more than 3,000 churches, more than 1,200 traveling preachers, 2,500 church-based preachers, about 140,000 members, and held 22 annual conferences, presided over by four bishops.

Growth in late 19th century

The MEC,S energetically tended its base: in 1880 it had 798,862 members (mostly white), and 1,066,377 in 1886. It expanded its missionary activity in Mexico.  Although usually avoiding politics, MEC,S in 1886 denounced divorce and called for Prohibition, stating: 

After 1844 the Methodists in the South increased their emphasis on an educated clergy. Ambitious young preachers from humble, rural backgrounds attended college, and were often appointed to serve congregations in towns. There they could build larger churches that paid decent salaries; they gained social prestige in a highly visible community leadership position. These ministers turned the pulpit into a profession, thus emulating the Presbyterians and Episcopalians. They created increasingly complex denominational bureaucracies to meet a series of pressing needs: defending slavery, evangelizing soldiers during the Civil War, promoting temperance reform, contributing to foreign missions (see American Southern Methodist Episcopal Mission), and supporting local colleges. The new urban middle-class ministry increasingly left their country cousins far behind. As the historian of the transformation explains, "Denomination building—that is, the bureaucratization of religion in the late antebellum South—was an inherently innovative and forward-looking task. It was, in a word, modern."

The returns for 1892 showed:
 Traveling preachers: 5,368
 Local preachers: 6,481
 White members: 1,282,750
 Colored members: 357
 Indian members: 10,759
 Total:        1,305,715
 Sunday-schools: 13,426
 SS teachers: 95,204
 SS students: 754,223
 Churches: 12,856
 Value: $20,287,112

Education

Methodist education had suffered during the Civil War, as most academies were closed. Some recovered in the late 19th century, but demand decreased as public education had been established for the first time by Reconstruction-era legislatures across the South. It was generally a segregated system, and racial segregation was established by law for public facilities under Jim Crow rules conditions in the late 19th century, after white Democrats regained control of state legislatures in the late 1870s.

In 1892 the Methodists had a total of 179 schools and colleges, all for white students. They had 892 teachers and 16,600 students, resulting in a high student/teacher ratio. The church in 1881 opened Holding Institute, which operated as a boarding school for nearly a century in Laredo, Texas. It instructed numerous students from Mexico during its years of operation.

The colleges were in scarcely better condition, though philanthropy of the late 19th and early 20th centuries dramatically changed their development. Most were primarily high-school level academies offering a few collegiate courses. The dramatic exception was Vanderbilt University, at Nashville, with a million-dollar campus and an endowment of $900,000, thanks to the Vanderbilt family. Much smaller and poorer were Randolph-Macon College in Virginia, with its two affiliated fitting-schools and Randolph-Macon Woman's College; Emory College, in Atlanta (as the infusion of Candler family money was far in the future); Emory & Henry, in Southwest Virginia; Wofford, with its two fitting-schools, in South Carolina; Trinity, in North Carolina—soon to be endowed by the Duke family and change its name; Central, in Missouri; Southern, in Alabama; Southwestern, in Texas; Wesleyan, in Kentucky; Millsaps, in Mississippi; Centenary, in Louisiana; Hendrix, in Arkansas; and Pacific, in California.

The growing need for a theology school west of the Mississippi River was not addressed until the founding of Southern Methodist University in Texas in 1911.  The denomination also supported several women's colleges, although they were more like finishing schools or academies until the twentieth century. At that time, they were developed to meet the standards of new accrediting agencies, such as the Southern Association of Colleges and Schools.  The oldest Methodist woman's college is Wesleyan College in Macon, Georgia; other Methodist colleges that were formerly women's institutions are Lagrange College and Andrew College in Georgia, Columbia College in South Carolina, and Greensboro College in North Carolina.

In March 1900, the East Columbia Conference of the Methodist Episcopal Church-South purchased an existing school called Milton Academy, built by the Seventh-day Adventist Church in Milton, Oregon. Renamed "Columbia College", it opened September 24, 1900 under Methodist leadership.  Due to declining enrollment and lack of funds, the school was closed in 1925.  First year enrollment was 131 pupils, under Dean W.C. Howard.  The original wood building was replaced in 1910 by a four-story stone building. It has been adapted for use as  the city hall of the combined cities of Milton-Freewater, Oregon.

Women

In the 1930s, the MEC and the Methodist Protestant Church, other Methodist denominations still operating in the South, agreed to ordain women either as local elders and deacons (the MEC) or full clergy (the Methodist Protestant Church). The MEC,S did not ordain women as pastors at the time of the 1939 merger that formed the Methodist Church.

Legacy
The MEC,S was responsible for founding four of the South's top divinity schools: Vanderbilt University Divinity School, Duke Divinity School, Candler School of Theology at Emory University, and Perkins School of Theology at Southern Methodist University.  Vanderbilt severed its ties with the denomination in 1914. Duke, Candler, and Perkins maintain a relationship with the United Methodist Church. All four enroll students who are primarily from mainline Protestant denominations, but religion is not a test for admittance. The denomination's publishing house, opened in 1854 in Nashville, Tennessee, eventually became the headquarters of the United Methodist Publishing House. See Abingdon Press and Cokesbury.

See also

:Category:American Methodist Episcopal, South bishops
 Christian Methodist Episcopal Church
 Methodist Episcopal Church
 African Methodist Episcopal Church
 African Methodist Episcopal Zion Church
Wesleyanism
United Methodist Church

Footnotes

References
  Alexander; Gross. A History of the Methodist Church, South in the United States 1907
 Bailey Kenneth K. "The Post Civil War Racial Separations in Southern Protestantism: Another Look." Church History 46 ( December 1977): 453–73.
 Bailey, Kenneth K., Southern White Protestantism in the Twentieth Century 1964.
 Bode, Frederick A., Protestantism and the New South: North Carolina Baptists and Methodists in Political Crisis. University Press of Virginia, 1975.
 Boles, John B., The Great Revival, 1787-1805: The Origins of the Southern Evangelical Mind University of Kentucky Press, 1972.
 Carney, Charity R. Ministers and Masters: Methodism, Manhood, and Honor in the Old South. Baton Rouge, LA: Louisiana State University Press, 2011.
 Dickerson, Dennis C., Religion, Race, and Region: Research Notes on A.M.E. Church History Nashville, A.M.E. Sunday School Union, 1995.
 Farish, Hunter D., The Circuit Rider Dismounts: A Social History of Southern Methodism, 1865-1900 1938
 Hatch, Nathan O., The Democratization of American Christianity Yale University Press, 1989.
 Heyrman, Christine Leigh. Southern Cross: The Beginnings of the Bible Belt Alfred A. Knopf, 1997.
 Hildebrand; Reginald F. The Times Were Strange and Stirring: Methodist Preachers and the Crisis of Emancipation Duke University Press, 1995
 Loveland, Anne C., Southern Evangelicals and the Social Order, 1800-1860 Louisiana State University Press, 1980
 Lyerly,  Cynthia Lynn. Methodism and the Southern Mind, 1770-1810 (1998)
 Mathews, Donald, Slavery and Methodism: A Chapter in American Morality, 1780-1845 Princeton University Press, 1965.
 Mathews, Donald. Religion in the Old South University of Chicago Press, 1977.
 McDowell, Patrick, The Social Gospel in the South: The Woman's Home Mission Movement in the Methodist Episcopal Church, South, 1886-1939. Louisiana State University Press, 1982
 Morrow; Ralph E. Northern Methodism and Reconstruction 1956
 Orchard, Vance, et al. Early History of the Milton-Freewater Area Valley Herald of Milton-Freewater, 1962
 Owen, Christopher H. The Sacred Flame of Love: Methodism and Society in Nineteenth-Century Georgia University of Georgia Press, 1998.
 Raboteau, Albert J. Slave Religion: The "Invisible Institution" in the Antebellum South Oxford University Press, 1978.
 Richey, Russell. Early American Methodism Indiana University Press, 1991.
 Schweiger; Beth Barton. The Gospel Working Up: Progress and the Pulpit in Nineteenth Century Virginia Oxford UP, 2000
 Snay, Mitchell. Gospel of Disunion: Religion and Separatism in the Antebellum South Cambridge University Press, 1993.
 Sparks, Randy J. On Jordan's Stormy Banks: Evangelicalism in Mississippi, 1773-1876 University of Georgia Press, 1994.
 Stowell, Daniel W. Rebuilding Zion: The Religious Reconstruction of the South, 1863-1877  Oxford University Press, 1998.
 Stroupe, Henry Smith. The Religious Press in the South Atlantic States, 1802-1865 Duke University Press, 1956.
 Sweet, William Warren. Virginia Methodism: A History 1955.
 Watkins, William Turner. Out of Aldersgate Nashville: Publishing House of the Methodist Episcopal Church, South, 1937.
 Westerfield Tucker; Karen B. American Methodist Worship Oxford University Press. 2000.
 Wigger, John H. Taking Heaven by Storm: Methodism and the Rise of Popular Christianity in America. Oxford University Press, 1998.

Primary sources
 Norwood, Fredrick A., ed. Sourcebook of American Methodism (1982)
  , esp. statistical data on p 26 for 1859

External links
 All the Divisions in American Methodism, A Look Back in Time from 1771 until 1939 and "Union"
 Christian Methodist Episcopal Church (CME Church) ... By Edward A. Hatfield at New Georgia Encyclopedia, 11/8/2007
 History of the great secession from the Methodist Episcopal Church ... By Charles Elliott
 History of Milton and Freewater, Oregon

 
United Methodist Church
South
South
Episcopal
Religious organizations established in 1844
Methodist denominations established in the 19th century
Methodist Episcopal South
Methodist denominations in North America
1845 establishments in the United States